Hits Mix is the first remix album by Cuban recording artist Celia Cruz. It featured two singles, a Spanglish remix version of "La Negra Tiene Tumbao", entitled "Gotta Get Down" and a dance remix of "Yo Vivire (I Will Survive)".

Upon release, the album peaked at number 106 on the Billboard 200, number two on the Billboard Latin Albums chart, and number one on the Billboard Tropical Albums chart. It became the best-selling Tropical album of 2003. It was also the ninth best-selling Latin album of 2003.

Recording and production
Producer Sergio George was hired to produce more traditional tracks for Cruz's fifty-ninth album, La Negra Tiene Tumbao (2001). However, George wanted to try something different. According to George, he played a demo version of "La Negra Tiene Tumbao" for Cruz, "not knowing how she would respond, and that was the song that she most reacted to". "La Negra Tiene Tumbao" was the last song completed for the album.

Musical composition
The original version of "La Negra Tiene Tumbao" combines elements of salsa music, reggae music and hip hop music. The song's title translates to "The Black Woman has Style" or "The Black Woman has Attitude". The song was composed in minor key and incorporates the use of vocal call and response.

"Yo Vivire (I Will Survive)" was originally performed by American singer Gloria Gaynor. It was written by Freddie Perren and Dino Fekaris. Cruz originally covered the song in Spanish on her 2000 album, Siempre Vivire (I Will Always Live).

Critical reception

An editor for Allmusic gave the album three out of five stars, insisting that the album contains "pumped-up remixes of favorites from previous releases." The reviewer claimed that Cruz alternates from "swooping, but not showy, melodic moves to rhythmic rapid-fire pronouncements" on the release. According to the reviewer, "Cruz starts what feels like a dance party headed towards the wee hours."

At the 2004 Latin Billboard Music Awards, the album was awarded the Greatest Hits Album of the Year Award. In the same category, Cruz was also nominated for Exitos Eternos (2003). Her 2004 album Regalo del Alma was awarded Tropical Album of the Year in the female category. Cobo predicted that the album should and would win the award. In the same category, Cruz was also nominated with Exitos Eternos and Hits Mix, also becoming the Top Latin Albums Artist of the Year.

Track listing

Charts

Weekly charts

Year-end charts

Sales and certifications

See also
List of number-one Billboard Tropical Albums from the 2000s

References

2002 remix albums
Celia Cruz remix albums
Sony Discos remix albums
Albums produced by Sergio George
Spanish-language remix albums